Mayavi is a Malayalam comics strip.

Mayavi may also refer to:
 Mayavi (1965 film)
 Mayavi (2007 film), directed by Shafi
 Mayavi (TV series), 2006–2007
 MayaVi, a scientific data visualizer written in Python

See also
 Maayavi, a 2005 Tamil film